Alma Junction is an unincorporated community in Park County, Colorado, United States,.

Geography

The Middle Fork South Platte River and Colorado State Highway 9 both run along the eastern edge of the community, while Mosquito Pass Road (CR 12) and the Mosquito Creek both pass through the middle of the community.

History
The arrival of the Denver, South Park and Pacific Railroad in 1882 was not only a boost to the community, but surrounding settlements as well.

In popular culture
In February 2020, Trey Parker and Matt Stone announced they were working on a film entitled Alma Junction. Since the community of Alma Junction is located near the fictional small town of South Park (the title and subject of successful animated television series and movie by Trey Parker and Stone), there was speculation as to whether the movie would involve the community or was Alma Junction just a working title. Popular contemplation, which later proved correct, was the production for The Book of Mormon, a movie adaptation of the theatrical musical comedy, The Book of Mormon.

See also

References

External links

Unincorporated communities in Colorado
Unincorporated communities in Park County, Colorado